The 27th Canadian Infantry Brigade (27CIBG) was an Active Force infantry brigade created on May 4, 1951, for service in West Germany. The brigade sailed to Rotterdam in November and December of that year. It was posted near Hanover and provided contingents for the Coronation of Queen Elizabeth II.

Formation

In the early 1950s, Canada had several armies.  In addition to the Canadian Army (Active), Canadian Army Regular Force, and the Special Force who had specifically enlisted for the Korean War. In January 1951, the Canadian Army formed a new infantry brigade to meet the country's commitments to NATO.

The brigade consisted of three infantry battalions called "PANDA battalions" (for Pacific and Atlantic).  They were the 1st Canadian Infantry Battalion (formed in Valcartier, Quebec, on 4 May 1951), the 1st Canadian Rifle Battalion and the 1st Canadian Highland Battalion. Each battalion drew their personnel from five infantry regiments of the same type (line infantry, rifle or highland). Each regiment formed a complete PANDA company within that battalion with the headquarters unit being a composite.

A reorganization of the Canadian Army in 1953 led to a force of 15 infantry battalions: three for Korea, three for Canada, three for Europe and six for rotation.

On 14 October 1953 the 1st Canadian Infantry Brigade was reactivated and replaced the 27th. In the same year its battalions were re-designated as the Canadian Guards, the Black Watch (Royal Highland Regiment) of Canada and the Queen's Own Rifles of Canada.

Footnotes

References
Berton, Pierre (2001). Marching As to War. Anchor Canada. 
Zuehlke, Mark (2001). The Canadian Military Atlas. Stoddart. .

Brigades of the Canadian Army
Infantry brigades of the Canadian Army
Allied occupation of Germany
Military units and formations established in 1951
Military units and formations disestablished in 1953
1951 establishments in Canada
1953 disestablishments in Canada